The North British distillery is a grain whisky distillery located in the Gorgie area of Edinburgh, Scotland. 

Established by a group of independent distillers in 1885, it is now a joint venture company between Diageo and Edrington Group. It is Edinburgh's last working distillery, widely known as the "NB".

History

With grain whisky consumption growing in the industrialised and railway connected Victorian era, independent distillers needed access to a high quality and high volume producer of pure grain alcohol.

In 1885, major shareholders Andrew Usher, William Sanderson and John M. Crabbie, with numerous other whisky-blenders as shareholders, had established the North British Distillery Company Limited. The company bought a  pig farm on the western outskirts of Edinburgh, adjacent to the developing suburb of Gorgie and Dalry. The site had a number of distinct advantages:

Direct access to the developing national railway network via the Edinburgh Suburban and Southside Junction Railway, allowing input access for grain and output distribution of product
Close access to the Port of Leith, allowing easy import of grain and later maize

Production started in 1887, and within a year of opening the distillery was producing  of spirit per year, output at a price of one shilling and three pence per proof gallon. Almost converted to acetone production for use in munitions, the site resumed production in 1920. Production had barely recovered to similar post-World War I levels by the start of World War II, which again saw production suspended. The site was used initially as a grain store, and latterly as a D Day supplies depot.

Just after resumption of production, in 1948 Scotland's first saladin maltings were installed. With rationing ending in the early 1950s, this spurred production to pre-World War I levels again. In the late 1950s the site was expanded to include the adjacent former Edinburgh Corporation Tramways depot, to provide space for new warehouses. In 1967, the Darney quarry at East Woodburn, Northumberland was reopened to allow an extension to the buildings in the original stone, and kept open for two years to allow additional offices and brewing facilities to be added.

In 1970,  of land were purchased at Addiewell, West Lothian to create six racked warehouses and a filling store, added to by an additional three racked warehouses in 1975. That same year an additional  adjacent plot was purchased on the opposite (south) side of the A71 road. At this time, expansion of output was enabled by investment in production facilities enabling  to be produced in 1979.

The late 1970s/early 1980s downturn brought job losses, as production capacity had been planned on a 10% year-on-year increase.

In 1993, shareholders Robertson & Baxter and International Distillers & Vintners formed joint venture company Lothian Distillers, which bought out all other shareholders for an agreed price of £84 Million.

Rationalisation led to the sale of the maltings and warehouse site on Slateford Road and the Westfield Road warehousing site in 2002 and 2003 respectively. The vast majority of maturation warehousing is at Addiewell where a further four warehouses have been built since 2002, on the site bought in 1975.

Current

Lothian Distillers, and hence the sites and production, is jointly owned by Diageo plc and the privately held Edrington Group.
Diageo subsidiary United Distillers & Vintners: Smirnoff vodka, Johnnie Walker whisky
Edrington: constituent of blended whiskies, including Famous Grouse whisky

To enable this, the company imports maize ( per week from France via the Port of Leith), along with a lesser amount of malted barley. The waste output husks are pelletised into cattle-feed, while the liquefied carbon dioxide is sold via contractor Air Products and Chemicals.

See also
 Scotch Whisky Research Institute

References

External links
Company website

Distilleries in Scotland
Scotch whisky
Manufacturing companies based in Edinburgh
1885 establishments in Scotland
Buildings and structures in Edinburgh
Food and drink companies established in 1885
Companies based in Edinburgh
Diageo
Diageo brands
Gorgie